SCSV Kamal Dewaker is a Surinamese football club based in Livorno. The club plays in the Surinamese Hoofdklasse, the top tier of football in the nation. The club was founded on August 15, 1941.

Current squad 2011–12

References 

Football clubs in Suriname
Football clubs in Livorno, Suriname
1941 establishments in Suriname
Association football clubs established in 1941